Corey Kofi Cheremeh Addai (born 10 October 1997) is an English professional footballer who plays for Crawley Town as a goalkeeper.

Addai played youth football for Arsenal, prior to joining Coventry City in 2014 signing a professional contract two years later. He had loan spells at Hendon, Dulwich Hamlet, AFC Telford United and Redditch United before leaving the club in January 2020. He spent the 2020–21 season with Barnsley, spending a short spell on loan at Chesterfield, and spent the following season in Denmark with Esbjerg fB. He signed for EFL League Two club Crawley Town in summer 2022.

Club career

Coventry City
Born in London, Addai was scouted for Arsenal's academy as a goalkeeper aged 10, having played in the position in a Sunday league game despite usually playing outfield. He joined Coventry City in 2014, signing his first professional contract with the club two years later. He joined Hendon on a youth loan in January 2018. He made five appearances for the club in all competitions. He joined Isthmian League Premier Division club Dulwich Hamlet on loan in March 2018. Addai scored a 90th-minute winner for the club with a free-kick from inside his own half in their 1–0 Velocity Trophy semi-final win over Brentwood Town on 7 March 2018. On 10 April 2018, he was recalled from his loan, having made 7 appearances.

On 26 July 2019, it was announced that Addai would join AFC Telford United on a month's loan from 2 August to 2 September. He made seven league appearances on loan at the club. On 12 September 2019, he joined Southern League club Redditch United on loan until January 2020. He made three league appearances for the club. Addai left Coventry at the end of January 2020 after his contract was cancelled by mutual consent.

Barnsley
Addai joined Barnsley in September 2020 following a trial at the club. In November 2020, he joined National League club Chesterfield on a one-month loan. He made two appearances on loan at the club. He was released by Barnsley at the end of the season.

Esbjerg fB
In September 2021, he joined Danish Danish 1st Division club Esbjerg fB on a one-year deal, having spent the 2021–22 pre-season on trial at Portsmouth. He made 4 league appearances over the course of the 2021–22 season.

Crawley Town
Addai signed for Crawley Town in July 2022. On 30 July 2022, he debuted for Crawley during a 0–1 loss to Carlisle.

International career
Born in England, Addai was called up to the Jamaica national team in May 2022, and made his unofficial debut in a 6–0 loss to Catalonia in the same month, replacing Dillon Barnes in the 56th minute.

Personal life
Addai was born in England to a Ghanaian father and Jamaican mother.

References

1997 births
Living people
Footballers from Greater London
English footballers
English sportspeople of Ghanaian descent
English sportspeople of Jamaican descent
Arsenal F.C. players
Coventry City F.C. players
Hendon F.C. players
Dulwich Hamlet F.C. players
AFC Telford United players
Redditch United F.C. players
Barnsley F.C. players
Chesterfield F.C. players
Esbjerg fB players
Crawley Town F.C. players
English Football League players
National League (English football) players
Southern Football League players
Isthmian League players
Danish 1st Division players
Association football goalkeepers
English expatriate footballers
English expatriates in Denmark
Expatriate men's footballers in Denmark
Black British sportspeople